Au, AU,  au or a.u. may refer to:

Science And Technology

Computing
 .au, the internet country code for Australia
 Au file format, Sun Microsystems' audio format
 Audio Units, a system level plug-in architecture from Apple Computer
 Adobe Audition, a sound editor program
 Windows Update or Automatic Updates, in Microsoft Windows
 Windows 10 Anniversary Update, of August 2016a

Physics and Chemistry
 Gold, symbol Au (from Latin ), a chemical element
 Absorbance unit, a reporting unit in spectroscopy
 Atomic units, a system of units convenient for atomic physics and other fields
 Ångström unit, a unit of length equal to 10−10 m or 0.1 nanometre. 
 Astronomical unit, a unit of length often used in Solar System astronomy, an approximation for the average distance between the Earth and the Sun
 Arbitrary unit, a relative placeholder unit for when the actual value of a measurement is unknown or unimportant ("a.u." is deprecated, use  "arb. unit" instead)

Arts and entertainment

Music
 AU (band), an experimental pop group headed by Luke Wyland
 Au, a 2010 release by Scottish rock band Donaldson, Moir and Paterson
 Au a track on Some Time in New York City by an album by John Lennon & Yoko Ono and Elephant's Memory

Magazines
 Alternative Ulster, a Northern Irish music magazine, now called AU
 A&U: America's AIDS Magazine, sponsor of the Christopher Hewitt Award

Literature
Alternative universe (fan fiction), fiction by fan authors that deliberately alters facts of the canonical universe written about.

Other Media
 Au Co, a fairy in Vietnamese mythology
 Age of Ultron, a 2013 series published by Marvel Comics
 A.U, a Chinese media franchise and brand

Organizations
 au (mobile phone company), a mobile phone operator in Japan
 African Union, a continental union
 Americans United for Separation of Church and State
 Athletic Union, the union of sports clubs in a British university
 Austral Líneas Aéreas (IATA code AU)
 Auxiliary Units, specially trained, highly secret units created by the United Kingdom government during the Second World War

Universities

Asia
 Ajou University  in Suwon, Gyeonggi, South Korea
 Abasyn University in Peshawar, Khyber Pakhtunkhwa, Pakistan
 Andhra University in Visakhapatnam, AP, India
 Anhui University in Hefei, Anhui, China 
 Aletheia University in New Taipei City, Taiwan
 Allahabad University in Allahabad, Uttar Pradesh, India
 Arellano University in Philippines
 Assumption University (Thailand) in Thailand
 Abhilashi University in Himachal Pradesh, India
 Adesh University in Bathinda, Punjab, India.

Europe
 Aarhus University in Aarhus, Denmark
 Aberystwyth University in Aberystwyth, Wales, United Kingdom
 Akademia Umiejętności in Kraków, Poland
 Arden University in Coventry, England

Oceania
 Auckland University in New Zealand

North America
 Adelphi University in Garden City, New York
 Alfred University in Alfred, New York
 Algoma University in Sault Ste. Marie, Ontario, Canada
 American University in Washington, D.C.
 Anaheim University in Anaheim, California
 Anderson University (Indiana) in Anderson, Indiana
 Anderson University (South Carolina) in Anderson, South Carolina
 Andrews University in Berrien Springs, Michigan
 Antioch University in Culver City, California
 Apollos University in Huntington Beach, California
 Arcadia University in Glenside, Pennsylvania
 Argosy University in Alameda, California
 Arizona University in Tucson, Arizona
 Ashland University in Ashland, Ohio
 Athabasca University in Athabasca, Alberta, Canada
 Auburn University in Auburn, Alabama
 Augsburg University in Minneapolis, Minnesota
 Aurora University in Aurora, Illinois

Other
 Air University (disambiguation), various Air Force universities

Places
 Aue (toponymy), a frequent element in Germanic toponymy
 Australia (ISO 3166 country code)
 Au, Guinea, Kankan Region

Austria
 Austria (informal two-letter country code) 
 Au, Vorarlberg, Bregenz, Austria
 Au am Leithaberge, Austria
 Au im Bregenzerwald, Austria

Germany
 Au (Munich), Munich, Germany
 Au (Schwarzwald), Baden-Württemberg, Germany
 Au (squat), a building and cultural center in Frankfurt, Germany
 Au am Rhein, Germany
 Au in der Hallertau, Germany

Switzerland
 Au, St. Gallen
 Au, Zürich
 Au peninsula
 Schloss Au, a château in Wädenswil

Vehicles
 Ford Falcon (AU), a family car made in Australia
 Vought AU, a post-World War II US Marine Corps variant of the F4U Corsair aircraft

Other Uses
 Aú, a cartwheel in the Brazilian martial art of Capoeira
 Au (surname), a Chinese family name
 Au language
 Ab urbe condita (sometimes abbreviated as a.u.), Latin for "from the founding of the City" (Rome)
 a'u, the Hawaiian name for the Pacific blue marlin